List of largest optical telescopes in the 19th century, are listings of what were, for the time period of the 19th century large optical telescopes. See List of largest optical telescopes in the 20th century for the 1900s. The list includes various refractor and reflector that were active some time between about 1799 to 1901.

The main reflecting technology  early on, speculum metal reflected some 2/3 of light, and also had higher maintenance due to tarnishing. Another technology were the 2-element refractors, which were extensively used in 19th century observatories despite their small apertures compared to the largest metal mirror, and later glass telescopes. The technology for silver-coated glass mirrors was developed in the mid-19th century, but was slow to catch on. A major technology advance of this time was the development of astrophotography, and some telescopes were tailored to this application. Also, a wide variety of scientific instruments were developed, such as for spectroscopy and various astronomical measurements.

Reflectors & refractors
Early reflectors using speculum metal had some of the record-breaking apertures of the day, but not necessarily high performance. Starting in the 1860s metal coated glass ('Silver on glass') reflector telescopes proved more durable, for example the Crossley Reflector, which continued to be used and upgraded even into the 21st century. Telescopes with lenses, especially achromatic doublets were popular in the 19th century. (see also Great Refractor)

(100 cm equals 1 meter)

 
 
 

* (First light or Build Completion to Inactive (Retired) or Deconstruction)

See also
Lists of telescopes
List of largest optical telescopes in the 20th century
List of largest optical telescopes in the 18th century
List of largest optical reflecting telescopes
List of minor planets: 1–1000 (Over 450 Minor planets were discovered in the 19th century)

References

External links
 List of large reflecting telescopes
 The World's Largest Optical Telescopes
 Largest optical telescopes of the world
 Selected largest telescopes
 Stellafane telescope links
 List of largest telescopes circa 1914
 Partial list of Fraunhofer refractors

Lists of telescopes
19th century-related lists